Presidential elections were held in Cameroon on 9 October 2011. Incumbent President Paul Biya stood for another term after a constitutional amendment passed in 2008 eliminated term limits. Biya was re-elected with 78% of the vote.

Background
Some opposition demands regarding voting rights for the diaspora were met before the election, when lawmakers passed an amendment to the electoral law in July 2011.

Candidates
Long-time opposition leader John Fru Ndi also stood as a candidate in the election. Fifty other people submitted paperwork to ELECAM, the electoral commission, seeking to stand as presidential candidates. Observers viewed the opposition as anemic and expected Biya to easily win re-election.

Daniel Soh Fone of the United Socialist Party withdrew before the election, giving his support to Biya.

Conduct
The United States Ambassador to Cameroon, Robert P. Jackson and former colonial power France have criticized the election, citing irregularities. Several political parties claimed they would challenge the results.

The mission Chief of the African Union's Observer Mission in Cameroon, former Prime Minister of Mali Ibrahim Boubacar Keïta stated in his report that the African Union judges found the vote to be "free, transparent and credible". La Francophonie and the Commonwealth also praised the election. Fred Mitchell, former Foreign Minister of The Bahamas, led the Commonwealth mission to Cameroon; he said that there were no signs that people were coerced to vote and the election was conducted peacefully.

Results

Aftermath
Biya was sworn in for another term as president in a ceremony held at the National Assembly on 3 November.

References

Presidential elections in Cameroon
Cameroon
Presidential
Cameroon